Hurdle is a surname. Notable people with the surname include:

Clint Hurdle (born 1957), American baseball player, coach, and manager
Gus Hurdle (born 1973), English footballer
Lana Hurdle, American public official
Kevin Hurdle (born 1976), Bermudian cricketer